By-elections to the 11th Canadian Parliament were held to elect members of the House of Commons of Canada between the 1908 federal election and the 1911 federal election. The Liberal Party of Canada led a majority government for the 11th Canadian Parliament.

The list includes a Ministerial by-election which occurred due to the requirement that Members of Parliament recontest their seats upon being appointed to Cabinet. These by-elections were almost always uncontested. This requirement was abolished in 1931.

See also
List of federal by-elections in Canada

Sources
 Parliament of Canada–Elected in By-Elections 

1910 elections in Canada
1909 elections in Canada
11th